Hitotsuse gawa (Japanese:一ツ瀬川) is a fresh water river located in Miyazaki prefecture in southern Japan. It drains to the  ocean.

References

Rivers of Japan